Count Carl Poul Oscar Moltke (2 January 1869 – 5 September 1935) was the Danish minister to the United States in 1908 and the Foreign Minister of Denmark 1924–1926.

Early life
Carl Poul Oscar Moltke was born on 2 January 1869 in Denmark. He was the son of Adam Henrik Carl Moltke (1828–1913) and Emma Christine, Countess Capizucchi di Cassini (1836–1870). His maternal grandparents were Poul Capizucchi di Cassini and Elisabeth Loy af Triest.

Family
His paternal grandfather, Carl Graf von Moltke (1798–1866), was a cousin of Adam Wilhelm Moltke (1785–1864), the first Danish Prime Minister in the Danish constitutional monarchy, and the great-grandson of Adam Gottlob Moltke (1710–1792), a Danish courtier, statesman and diplomat, and favourite of Frederick V of Denmark. His family was very involved in both Danish and German history.

Career
From 1908 to 1912, Moltke was the Danish Ambassador to the United States.  He later represented his country as the Ambassador to Germany in Berlin. In 1920, the secretary of the Danish legation in Berlin during World War I, Count Bent Holstein, brought serious charges against Moltke, saying:

The radical Government tried every way to strangle the Slesvig question. The Danish Ambassador in Berlin thus went to the German Foreign Department during the war proposing that Germany give very many iron crosses to men from North Slesvig in order to make them forget Denmark. Not a German, but the Danish Ambassador under the Zahles Government tried Danish souls with German iron crosses.

In 1924, he was chosen by Thorvald Stauning, the first social democratic Prime Minister of Denmark, to be the Foreign Minister of Denmark, serving from 23 April 1924 to 14 December 1926, until Thomas Madsen-Mygdal became Prime Minister.

In February and March 1930, he served as the chairman of the "Conference for Concerted Economic Action" in Geneva as part of the League of Nations.  As chairman, he urged European economic unity to better conditions throughout the world with the aid of the Belgian Foreign Minister, Paul Hymans (who later served as the 2nd President of the League of Nations).  He envisioned a broad conception of European economic organization and proposed a tariff truce, which he described as "the consolidation of duties."

Personal life
On 29 June 1907, he married Cornelia Van Rensselaer Thayer (1881–1960), an American who was the daughter of Nathaniel Thayer III. She was born in Boston and was the granddaughter of Nathaniel Thayer Jr. (1808–1883), who married Cornelia Paterson, the daughter of Stephen Van Rensselaer IV. She was also descended from Thomas Cornell as well as the Bayard, Livingston, and Schuyler families.  At the wedding, Baron Rosencrantz was his best man. Together, they had a son:

 Count Carl Adam Moltke (1908–1989), a member of the Danish underground in World War II, who married Mabel Wilson Wright (née Comstock) in 1944 (1909–1988). They divorced in 1956 and later that same year, he married Doris Eccles (1914-1965), the daughter of Edward Eccles (1882–1975) of Newport, Rhode Island.

Moltke died on 5 September 1935, aged 66, in Copenhagen.

Descendants
He was the paternal grandfather of Countess Victoria Ann Moltke and Countess Cornelia Alexandra Moltke Isles (b. 1947), an actress and documentary filmmaker.

References
Notes

Sources

1869 births
1935 deaths
Carl
Ambassadors of Denmark to the United States
Foreign ministers of Denmark